Home of the Brave is a 2004 documentary film about Viola Liuzzo, an American anti-racist activist during the Civil Rights Movement of the 1960s.

Description
A white housewife and mother of five children, Viola Liuzzo felt called to action by the words of Martin Luther King Jr., and left her Michigan home to work in Alabama with the Southern Christian Leadership Conference in 1965. While serving as a volunteer during the historic Selma to Montgomery marches, Liuzzo was shot dead by members of the Ku Klux Klan. The film is an historical account of her life presented in a montage of archival footage, narrated by the actress Stockard Channing and laced with extensive interviews of Liuzzo's family members and contemporaries.

Production
Home of the Brave was written, directed, and co-produced by Paola di Florio. The 75-minute film was released by Emerging Pictures in late 2004.

Critical reception and review
Home of the Brave was nominated for the 2004 IDA Award by the International Documentary Association, and was selected for competition at that year's Sundance Festival.

It was nominated for Best Documentary Screenplay by the Writers Guild of America in 2005, and was one of the films featured at the first annual Traverse City Film Festival in 2005.

The New York Times praised di Florio's "poignant documentary" for depicting "the freshly outraging story of Liuzzo's death and of her difficult legacy to her children." Although the film highlighted familiar footage of marchers on the Edmund Pettus Bridge and of demonstrators in Birmingham being attacked with fire hoses, the Times said that it "distinguishes itself with touching film of Jim Liuzzo and his children being interviewed and of political leaders of the day."

See also
 Civil rights movement in popular culture

References

External links
 
DVD Review: Home of the Brave, The Defiant Spirit of Viola Liuzzo, Revolution, February 10, 2008

2004 films
American documentary films
Documentary films about the civil rights movement
Selma, Alabama
Documentary films about crime in the United States
Selma to Montgomery marches
Documentary films about Alabama
2000s English-language films
2000s American films